La Chapelle-Bâton may refer to the following places in France:

 La Chapelle-Bâton, Deux-Sèvres, a commune in the Deux-Sèvres department
 La Chapelle-Bâton, Vienne, a commune in the Vienne department